

Weymouth Beach is a gently curving arc of sand in Weymouth Bay, beside the town of Weymouth in Dorset, England.  Immediately adjacent to the beach is The Esplanade.

The beach is a popular destination for sea bathing, and was frequented by King George III during times of illness. The king named Weymouth his 'first resort' and made bathing fashionable there.  George III was advised to take the waters after his first bout of porphyria.

Weymouth Beach is very wide and gently sloping, with golden sand and shallow waters normally with small waves.  In addition to bathing, the expansive beach is used for beach motocross and volleyball.

The beach has the traditional attractions of an English seaside resort, including (during the summer season)  donkey rides, Punch and Judy, sand sculptures, trampolines, a small funfair for children, and pedalo hire.

At the southern end is Weymouth Pier, including the Pavilion Theatre and Weymouth Sea Life Tower. At the northeastern end is the suburb of Greenhill, with Furzy Cliff and Bowleaze Cove beyond that.

Gallery
In 2011 new structures connecting the promenade and beach in the shape of Upturned Boats have been developed by local business, and have proved a great success

See also
List of Dorset beaches
Weymouth Bay

References

External links
 
 Esplanade Camera, Weymouth & Portland Borough Council

Beach
Beach
Beaches of Dorset
Jurassic Coast